"Emotionless" is a song by Canadian musician Drake from his fifth studio album Scorpion (2018). Drake co-wrote the song with its producers No I.D., Noah "40" Shebib, and The 25th Hour. Mariah Carey, Robert Clivillés, and David Cole received songwriting credits for the sampling of a club remix of Carey's 1991 hit single "Emotions". Commercially, it has reached the top ten in the United Kingdom and the United States, giving Carey her 25th top-ten single as a songwriter in the latter country.

Personnel
Credits adapted from the album's liner notes and Tidal.
 Noel Cadastre – recording
 Noel "Gadget" Campbell – mixing
 Greg Moffet – mixing assistance, recording assistance
 Harley Arsenault – mixing assistance, recording assistance
 Ronald Moonoo – mixing assistance
 Noah "40" Shebib – production, recording
 No I.D. – production
 The 25th Hour – production

Charts

Certifications

References

2018 songs
Drake (musician) songs
Songs written by Drake (musician)
Songs written by Mariah Carey
Songs written by No I.D.
Songs written by 40 (record producer)
Songs written by Robert Clivillés
Songs written by David Cole (record producer)